The 2022 Ole Miss Rebels football team represented the University of Mississippi in the 2022 NCAA Division I FBS football season. The Rebels played their home games at Vaught–Hemingway Stadium in Oxford, Mississippi, and competed in the Western Division of the Southeastern Conference (SEC). They were led by third-year head coach Lane Kiffin.

Previous season
The Rebels finished the 2021 season 10–3, 6–2 in SEC play to finish in second place in the Western Division. This was the first season in school history where the team finished with 10 wins in the regular season. They were invited to the 2022 Sugar Bowl where they were defeated by No. 7 Baylor.

Schedule
Ole Miss and the SEC announced the 2022 football schedule on September 21, 2021.

Game summaries

Troy

Central Arkansas

Georgia Tech

Tulsa

No. 7 Kentucky

Vanderbilt

Auburn

LSU

Texas A&M

No. 9 Alabama

Arkansas

Mississippi State

Texas Tech

Coaching staff

Rankings

References

Ole Miss
Ole Miss Rebels football seasons
Ole Miss Rebels football